The Beilstein Journal of Nanotechnology is a peer-reviewed platinum open-access scientific journal covering all aspects of nanoscience and nanotechnology. It is published by the Beilstein Institute for the Advancement of Chemical Sciences and the editor-in-chief is Thomas Schimmel (Karlsruhe Institute of Technology). The journal was established in 2010.

Abstracting and indexing
The journal is abstracted and indexed in:
Chemical Abstracts Service
Current Contents/Physical, Chemical & Earth Sciences
Ei Compendex
Science Citation Index Expanded
Scopus
According to the Journal Citation Reports, the journal has a 2020 impact factor of 3.65.

References

External links

Nanotechnology journals
Continuous journals
English-language journals
Publications established in 2010